The Michigan Wolverines women's water polo team represents the University of Michigan in National Collegiate Athletics Association (NCAA) Division I competition. College water polo became a varsity sport at the University of Michigan in 2001. Marcelo Leonardi was the head coach since 2015. Coach Churnside arrived in Michigan to coach the 2023 season, after being an assiatant coach at Harvard University.

References

External links
Michigan Women's Water Polo

 
College women's water polo teams in the United States